Decolonizing Methodologies: Research and Indigenous Peoples is a book by Linda Tuhiwai Smith. Originally published in 1999, Decolonizing Methodologies is a foundational text in Indigenous studies that explores the intersections of colonialism and research methodologies.

Summary
The book begins with the line "The word itself, 'research', is probably one of the dirtiest words in the indigenous world's vocabulary." Smith contends that Western paradigms of research are "inextricably linked to European imperialism and colonialism."

Smith concludes the book by articulating how she believes Kaupapa Māori research methods could be implemented.

Impact and reception
Decolonizing Methodologies offers a vision of kaupapa Māori research that has been enormously influential. Ranginui Walker described the book as "a dynamic interpretation of power relations of domination, struggle and emancipation". Laurie Anne Whitt praised the book as a "powerful critique of dominant research methodologies."

New Zealand historian Peter Munz decried the book's political agenda, noting "what the author calls “colonising” research amounts to nothing more than subjecting a culture’s parochial self-image to critical scrutiny. Such research is emancipatory in the sense that it is likely to weaken old habits and beliefs and encourage the parochial society’s smooth transition into a wider, possibly global, community. To call it “colonising” is nothing less than emotional politics".

In 2021 the Spanish translation of the book, A descolonizar metodologías, published by LOM was brought by Elisa Loncón to the "plurinational library" of the Constitutional Convention of Chile.

See also
Critical theory
Decolonization
Decolonization of knowledge
Tikanga Māori

References 

1999 non-fiction books
Critical theory
Decolonization
Epistemology books
History of colonialism
Works about colonialism
Zed Books books